Fyodor Yakovlevich Bursak (1750–1827) was a Russian Imperial General and the Cossack military chieftain of the Black Sea Cossacks. Known as a ruthless general with no mercy, he took an active part in the Circassian genocide.

Biography 
Born in 1750 in the noble family of Antonovich in the Kharkiv region, he studied at Kiev.

He participated as an ordinary Cossack raider in the Russian-Turkish War of 1768–1774. His success in raids promoted him in ranks.

With the settlement of the Black Sea troops in the Kuban, he was appointed on December 22, 1799 as a military chieftain in the border with Circassia. He immediately organized several raids against the Circassians, and personally ordered his men to burn all Circassian villages they see, even if they are villages that are loyal to the Russian Empire. During his command, the Black Sea Cossacks organized countless similar raids against the Circassians.

He died and was buried in 1827 near the military cathedral on the Fortress Square of the Yekaterinodar Fortress.

References 

People from Krasnodar Krai
Recipients of the Order of St. Anna, 2nd class
Deaths in the Russian Empire
1827 deaths
1750 births
Russian military personnel of the Caucasian War
People of the Caucasian War
Circassian genocide perpetrators
Murder in the Russian Empire